Ville Heimonen (6 March 1875, Rautalampi – 1 July 1951) was a Finnish trade union activist and politician. He served as a Member of the Parliament of Finland from 1907 to 1908, representing the Social Democratic Party of Finland (SDP).

References

1875 births
1951 deaths
People from Rautalampi
People from Kuopio Province (Grand Duchy of Finland)
Social Democratic Party of Finland politicians
Members of the Parliament of Finland (1907–08)